C. neglecta may refer to:
 Castilleja neglecta, the Tiburon Indian paintbrush, an endangered perennial plant species
 Catocala neglecta, a moth species found in Mongolia
 Celastrina neglecta, the summer azure, a butterfly species found in North America
 Cernuella neglecta, the dune snail, a small air-breathing land snail species
 Crocidura neglecta, the neglected shrew, a mammal species endemic to Indonesia

Synonyms
 Calamagrostis neglecta, a synonym for Calamagrostis stricta, a grass species native to wetlands of the Holarctic Kingdom
 Correa neglecta, a synonym for Correa pulchella, a small shrub species endemic to South Australia

See also
 Neglecta (disambiguation)